Too Hard Basket, subtitled B Sides and Bastards, is a limited release compilation of B-sides and unreleased tracks by the New Zealand band the Mutton Birds. The album was released via the band's website and gig sales.

Track listing
(All songs by Don McGlashan except where noted)
"It Happened One Night" (Jody Harris) – 3.02 (different mix to that released with "The Heater")
"The Ballad of Kelvin" – 4.16 ("Heater" B-side - NZ only)
"He Turned Around" – 4.49 ("Heater" B-side - NZ only)
"Three Minutes" – 4.11 (previously unreleased)
"So Long" (Alan Gregg) – 3.05 (previously unreleased)
"The Heater (Careful With...Version)" – 3.34 ("Anchor Me" B-side - NZ only)
"The Queen's English (Annus Horribilus Mix)" –5.21 ("Ngaire" B-side - NZ only)
"Cinema of Unease"  – 3.09 (previously unreleased)
"Don't Fear The Reaper" (Donald Roeser) – 5.26 (original demo version - "She's Been Talking" B-side - NZ only)
"Ash Wednesday" – 4.44 (previously unreleased)
"Ranchslider" – 2.47 (previously unreleased)
"Answerphone" (David Long) – 3.22 (different version to that released with "Come Around" NZ single)
"Face in the Paper"  – 3.51 ("Come Around" B-side - UK)
"Inbetween Man" – 3.33 ("She's Been Talking" B-side - UK different mix to NZ "Envy Of Angels" version)
"Along The Boundary" – 4.58 (different mix to UK "Come Around" B-side and NZ "Envy Of Angels" version)

Personnel
Don McGlashan – vocals, guitars, euphonium
Ross Burge – drums
Alan Gregg – bass guitar, voice
David Long – lead guitar

References
All information taken from the sleeve and insert of the CD.

The Mutton Birds albums
B-side compilation albums
1998 compilation albums